Jasmine Suraya Chin Xian Mei (born 10 November 1989) is a Malaysian television presenter and actress from Kuching, Sarawak. She is best known for portraying Lily in the 2018 Malaysian action film PASKAL, co-starring with Hairul Azreen.

Filmography

Film

Drama

Telemovie

Television

References

External links
 
 
 
 
 
Jasmine Suraya Chin di Youtube

1989 births
Living people
Malaysian people of Chinese descent
People from Sarawak
Malaysian television presenters
Malaysian women television presenters
Malaysian television actresses
Malaysian film actresses
Monash University alumni